The 2023 Mediterranean Beach Games (Greek: Μεσογειακοί Παράκτιοι Αγώνες 2023) is the third edition of the Mediterranean Beach Games. It will be held from 2 to 9 September 2023 in Heraklion, Greece.

Host city selection
The Greek city of Heraklion was elected as host city of the third edition of the Mediterranean Beach Games (2023) during the ordinary General Assembly of the ICMG which was held in 2021 via Zoom Video Communications meeting.

References

Mediterranean Beach Games
Multi-sport events in Greece
Mediterranean Beach Game
Mediterranean Beach Game
Sport in Heraklion
International sports competitions hosted by Greece
Mediterranean Beach Game
Mediterranean Beach Games